Vertical's Currency is the third studio album by Kip Hanrahan, released in 1984 and featuring Jack Bruce and saxophonist David Murray. It was described by The Boston Globe as "Hanrahans's first attempt at a pop record".

Critical reception 
The Boston Globe called it "an honest attempt at formulating his musical collages from jazz to Nuyorican Latin to noise rock and Haitian music within more traditional forms. It might not be revolutionary, but it's still an intelligent, well-crafted work and a cut above standard pop fare.

A 1985 Spin review described it as "Like tangos, like salsa, like bossa, like sambas, with Jack Bruce on vocals and David Murray on tenor. Very tropical and layered with Bruce's Celtic bop vocals and Murray's effervescent and exultant sax."

Track listing

Personnel 
David Murray – tenor saxophone 
Jack Bruce – vocals, bass, piano
Steve Swallow – bass
Peter Scherer – synclavier, organ
Arto Lindsay – guitar
Ignacio Berroa – drums
Milton Cardona – congas, bongos 
Puntilla Orlando Rios – congas, bongos

References 

1984 albums
Kip Hanrahan albums